La Berthaudiere is a settlement in Guadeloupe in the commune of Anse-Bertrand, on the island of Grande-Terre.  Anse-Bertrand and Mahaudiere are to its west, and Pressec and Massioux lie to the south.

Populated places in Guadeloupe